Three ships of the United States Navy have been named Burrows, in honor of William Ward Burrows II.

 , was a galley launched in 1814 and served in the Battle of Lake Champlain.
 , was a modified  launched in 1910 and served in World War I and then served in the United States Coast Guard from 1924 to 1930.
 , was a  launched in 1943 and sold to The Netherlands in 1950.

References
 

United States Navy ship names